The Sand Range is a mountain range in Washoe County, Nevada.

References 

Mountain ranges of Nevada
Mountain ranges of Washoe County, Nevada